Luigi Giorgi (born 19 April 1987) is an Italian footballer who plays as a midfielder for Mantova.

Club career
Giorgi, started his professional career with Ascoli). In the 2006/2007 season Ascoli loaned him to Foligno on Serie C2 with 26 appearances. In the 2007 season Giorgi return on Serie B with Ascoli.

In 2011, he was sold to Novara for an undisclosed fee. On 16 January 2012 he transferred on loan to Siena in Serie A.
On 30 August 2012, he moved on loan to Palermo in exchange for Swedish striker Agon Mehmeti. He returned to Novara in January, but left again, this time to Atalanta.

On 9 July 2013, Atalanta signed Giorgi after a successful loan spell.

On 8 January 2019, he signed with Teramo. On 12 April 2019, he terminated his contract with the club.

References

External links
Career profile (from aic.it)

Living people
1987 births
People from Ascoli Piceno
Sportspeople from the Province of Ascoli Piceno
Association football midfielders
Italian footballers
Serie A players
Serie B players
Serie C players
Ascoli Calcio 1898 F.C. players
A.S.D. Città di Foligno 1928 players
Novara F.C. players
A.C.N. Siena 1904 players
Palermo F.C. players
Atalanta B.C. players
A.C. Cesena players
Spezia Calcio players
S.S. Teramo Calcio players
Mantova 1911 players
Footballers from Marche